The Mystery of Room 13 is a 1915 American silent mystery film directed by George Ridgwell and starring Marc McDermott, Lillian Herbert and Guido Colucci.

Cast
 Marc McDermott as Clay Foster
 Lillian Herbert as June Baxter
 Guido Colucci as Count Giuseppe Rizzo
 Carlton S. King as Bruce Spencer
 T. Tamamoto as Antonio Guerrio
 Lena Davril as Phillipa Guerrio
 Margery Bonney Erskine as Mrs. Montague
 George A. Wright as The Waiter

References

Bibliography
Ken Wlaschin. Silent Mystery and Detective Movies: A Comprehensive Filmography. McFarland, 2009.

External links
 

1915 films
1915 mystery films
American silent feature films
American mystery films
American black-and-white films
Films directed by George Ridgwell
Edison Studios films
1910s English-language films
1910s American films
Silent mystery films